This list of museums in Rhode Island encompasses museums defined for this context as institutions (including nonprofit organizations, government entities, and private businesses) that collect and care for objects of cultural, artistic, scientific, or historical interest and make their collections or related exhibits available for public viewing. Museums that exist only in cyberspace (i.e., virtual museums) are not included. Defunct museums are listed in a separate section.



Current

Defunct
 Beechwood (mansion), closed in 2010  
 The Doll Museum, Newport, closed in 2005 
 Old Colony & Newport Railway, Newport, operates narrated historical tours using 100-year-old passenger equipment, still has its equipment on the track  (and 2017).
 Soviet submarine K-77, Providence

See also

List of museums
Nature Centers in Rhode Island

References

Museums
Rhode Island
Museums